Telnice is a municipality and village in Brno-Country District in the South Moravian Region of the Czech Republic. It has about 1,600 inhabitants.

Geography
It lies in the Dyje–Svratka Valley. The small river Říčka flows through the municipality.

History
The first written mention of Telnice is from 1244.

Telnice was a battlefield of the Battle of Austerlitz on 2 December 1805. Austrians under Michael von Kienmayer and Russians under Dmitry Dokhturov and Friedrich Wilhelm von Buxhoeveden wrested the village from the French 3rd Line Infantry Regiment, lost it to a counterattack, and finally recaptured it. After the battle went against the allies farther north, they evacuated Telnice and retreated, suffering heavy losses in men and artillery pieces.

Sights

The landmark of the village is the Church of Saint John the Baptist. It was built in the Baroque style in 1726–1734 and has a Romanesque tower.

Notable people
Bohuslav Sobotka (born 1971), politician, Prime Minister of the Czech Republic in 2011–2017

References

External links

Villages in Brno-Country District